Tove Christensen (born February 20, 1973) is a Canadian-American film producer and actor. He is the older brother of actor Hayden Christensen.

Early life
Christensen was born in Vancouver, British Columbia, the son of Alie, an American speechwriter for the heads of large companies, and David Christensen, a Canadian software program writer and communications executive. His father is of Danish descent, and his mother has Italian and Swedish ancestry. He has a younger brother, actor Hayden Christensen, and two younger sisters, Hejsa and Kaylen. He attended the University of Pennsylvania.

Career
Christensen has been a producer and an actor. He is best known for producing the film Shattered Glass, in which his brother, Hayden, starred, working with actors Peter Sarsgaard, Chloë Sevigny, Rosario Dawson, Melanie Lynskey, and Hank Azaria. Christensen also produced The Education of Charlie Banks, which starred Jesse Eisenberg and Jason Ritter. He has acted in one film, Without Limits (1998), which starred Donald Sutherland, Billy Crudup, Monica Potter, and Matthew Lillard, and in the television show, Buffy the Vampire Slayer, in which he played a supporting character of a prom attendee who gets assaulted by "devil dogs". He had a line of dialogue in the episode, and was billed only as "Tuxedo Boy".

Filmography

Producer

Actor

Himself

References

External links
 
 

Film producers from British Columbia
Canadian male film actors
Male actors from Vancouver

Canadian people of American descent
Canadian people of Danish descent
Canadian people of Italian descent
Canadian people of Swedish descent
1973 births

Living people